Water shrew may refer to any of several species of semiaquatic red-toothed shrews:
Asiatic water shrews (Chimarrogale spp.)
Malayan water shrew (C. hantu)
Himalayan water shrew (C. himalayica)
Sunda water shrew (C. phaeura)
Japanese water shrew (C. platycephala)
Chinese water shrew (C. styani)
Sumatran water shrew (C. sumatrana)
Nectogale
Elegant water shrew (N. elegans)
Neomys
Mediterranean water shrew (N. anomalus)
Eurasian water shrew (N. fodiens)
Transcaucasian water shrew (N. teres)
Sorex:
Glacier Bay water shrew (S. alaskanus)
American water shrew (S. palustris)
Pacific water shrew or marsh shrew (S. bendirii)

Aquatic mammals